Brickellia megaphylla is a Mexican species of flowering plants in the family Asteraceae. It is native to the state of Baja California Sur in western Mexico near the community of Loreto.

Brickellia megaphylla is a shrub up to 240 cm (8 feet) tall. It produces numerous flower heads in flat-topped arrays.

References

megaphylla
Flora of Baja California Sur
Plants described in 1933